Guillermo Gonzales (born October 21, 1976) is an Italian singer, songwriter and musician.

Biography 

From 1994 to 2008, Gonzales was the frontman of the Italian extreme metal band Mothercare, especially known for their collaboration with Mark Greenway from Napalm Death and Mieszko Talarczyk from Nasum.

After leaving Mothercare in September 2008, two months later he was called by long-time friend Davide Tiso to substitute
Luciano George Lorusso as Ephel Duath's vocalist, but this experience came to an end shortly, as the band parted ways with their long-time label Earache in 2009.

Since 2012, he has been running several musical projects with Italian virtuoso percussionist , spanning from jazz to prog rock and from ethnic music to experimental music, collaborating with a vast range of musicians.

In 2014, he joined, as second vocalist,  winners . a psychedelic folk-rock band where Sbibu plays the ground drums.

Discography

Mothercare

1998 – In a Hole (demo EP)
2000 – Fusoku no Kigen
2003 – Breathing Instructions
2005 – Traumaturgic

Mugen 
2012 – Mugen (self-produced)

Perfect Pair 
2017 - Perfect Pair

Submarine Silence 
2016 - Journey Through Mine
Oct/Nov 2020 - Did Swans Ever See God?

Tarkampa 
2017 - Tres Ritus Marins

Guest
2007 - Mainline - Empathize with your Enemies (guest vocals)
2010 - Blame - My Epitaph (Instinct Extinct) (guest vocals)
2015 - Mothercare - Chronicles of Ordinary Hatred (guest vocals on "Relics", Nasum's cover )

References

External links 
 Mothercare Official
 Submarine Silence Official
 Tarkampa Official

Living people
1976 births
Italian male  songwriters
21st-century Italian male  singers